Jade is the third album by the German gothic metal band Flowing Tears. It is their first album after changing their name from Flowing Tears & Withered Flowers.

Track listing

Line-up 

Stefanie Duchêne – vocals
Benjamin Buss – guitars, programming
Manfred Bersin – guitars
Frederic Lesny – bass
Mike Volz – keyboards
Eric Hilt – drums

References 

Flowing Tears albums
2000 albums
Century Media Records albums
Albums produced by Waldemar Sorychta